The Cranberry Harvest, Island of Nantucket is an 1880 oil painting on canvas by Eastman Johnson.

References

External links
 

1880 paintings
Paintings by Eastman Johnson
Paintings in the collection of the Timken Museum of Art
Farming in art